Lorris Elijah Borden (June 20, 1877 – July 19, 1963) was a surgeon and political figure in British Columbia. He represented Nelson in the Legislative Assembly of British Columbia from 1928 to 1933 as a Conservative.

He was born in Canning, Nova Scotia in 1877, the son of Benjamin H. Borden and Sarah Cox, and was educated in Kentville and Dalhousie University, Halifax. In 1899, Borden married Neva Zwick. Borden took part in a Canadian government expedition to the Arctic in 1903. During that time, he studied diseases among the Inuit and collected a number of carvings and other artifacts which were donated to the government by his wife after his death. This collection is now stored at the Canadian Museum of Civilization. Borden also served as a major in the Canadian Army Medical Corps. He died on July 19, 1963 in Victoria.

His memoirs were published in 1996 by Edward L. Affleck.

References 

1877 births
1963 deaths
British Columbia Conservative Party MLAs